Carl Pedersen may refer to:

 Carl Pedersen (footballer) (1891-1964), Norwegian footballer
 Carl Pedersen (gymnast) (1883–1971), Danish gymnast who competed in the 1912 Summer Olympics
 Carl Pedersen (rower) (1884–1968), Danish rower who competed in the 1912 Summer Olympics
 Carl Pedersen (sport shooter) (born 1888), Danish sport shooter
 Carl Alfred Pedersen (1882–1960), Norwegian gymnast and triple jumper who competed in the 1906, 1908 and 1912 Summer Olympics
 Carl Brisson (1895–1958), born Carl Frederik Ejnar Pedersen, Danish singer and actor

See also
 Carl-Henning Pedersen (1913–2007), Danish painter